The  was a tilting diesel multiple unit (DMU) train type operated by Hokkaido Railway Company (JR Hokkaido) on Super Hokuto limited express services in Hokkaido, Japan, from 1994 until 2022. They were the first tilting trains to be operated by JR Hokkaido.

Formations

7-car formations
7-car sets were normally formed as follows, with car 1 at the Sapporo end. Car 3 was a Green (first class) car.

8-car formations
Sets lengthened to 8 cars were normally formed as follows, with car 1 at the Sapporo end. Car 3 was a Green car.

Individual vehicle types

KiHa 281-900

 Nos. KiHa 281-901–902 (2 vehicles)
Pre-production driving (control) cars built by Fuji Heavy Industries and delivered in January 1992. Seating capacity is 48, with toilets.

KiHa 280-900

 No. KiHa 280-901 (1 vehicle)
Pre-production intermediate car built by Fuji Heavy Industries and delivered in October 1992. Seating capacity is 60.

KiHa 281-0

 Nos. KiHa 281-1–6 (6 vehicles)
Production driving (control) cars built by Fuji Heavy Industries and delivered from 1993. Seating capacity is 48, with toilets.

KiHa 280-0

 Nos. KiHa 280-1–4 (4 vehicles)
Production intermediate cars built by Fuji Heavy Industries and delivered from 1993. Seating capacity is 51, with wheelchair space, universal access toilets, and a telephone.

KiHa 280-100

 Nos. KiHa 280-101–110 (10 vehicles)
Production intermediate cars built by Fuji Heavy Industries and delivered from 1993. Seating capacity is 60, with conductor's compartment, but no toilets.

KiRo 280-0

 Nos. KiRo 280-1–4 (4 vehicles)
Production Green (first class) cars built by Fuji Heavy Industries and delivered from 1993. Seating capacity is 26, with conductor's compartment, toilets, and a smoking area.

Interior
Passenger seating used the same rotating/reclining seats as used on the 785 series EMUs. Seating is arranged 2+2 abreast in standard class and 2+1 abreast in Green class.Green car accommodation is scheduled to undergo a programme of refurbishment.

History

Pre-production sets
Two pre-production cars, KiHa 281-901 and KiHa 281-902, were delivered from Fuji Heavy Industries in January 1992 for evaluation and testing. A pre-production intermediate car, KiHa 280-901, also built by Fuji Heavy Industries, was delivered in October 1992 to form a 3-car set. The first two cars delivered used the same roller-tilting mechanism on the bogies as used on the earlier JR Shikoku 2000 series DMUs, whereas the third car delivered used a bearing-guide system. The pre-production 3-car train underwent test-running to evaluate the two different systems in the harsh winter conditions of Hokkaido. The later bearing-guide tilt mechanism proved superior, and this system was used on subsequent production trains delivered from 1993.

Entry into service

The KiHa 281 series entered revenue service from the start of the revised timetable on 1 March 1994.

The original "HEAT281" logo on cab sides of the pre-production trains was changed from "Hokkaido Experimental Advanced Train" to "Hokkaido Express Advanced Train" with the arrival of the production cars. This logo was later changed to "Furico 281" to match the style used on the newer KiHa 283 series trains.

Laurel Prize
The KiHa 281 series was awarded the Laurel Prize in 1995 for its outstanding functional and design features.

Withdrawal 

On 13 July 2022, JR Hokkaido announced its plans to withdraw the KiHa 281 series from operation and replace the type with the KiHa 261 series. The KiHa 281 series made its final run in regular service on 30 September 2022. Pre-production car KiHa 281-901 was repainted to feature the original livery and "HEAT281" logo in preparation for a chartered final-run train that will run between 22 and 23 October.

References

External links

 JR Hokkaido KiHa 281/283 Super Hokuto train information 

281 series
Hokkaido Railway Company
Tilting trains
Train-related introductions in 1994
281